Remontowa (full name: Gdańska Stocznia "Remontowa" im. J. Piłsudskiego S.A.) is a company and shipyard in Gdańsk, Poland. The yard specialises in ship repair and conversions. Remontowa S.A. is one of 26 companies that make up the Remontowa Group. It is the biggest shipyard in Poland.

History
 The yard was established on 1 July 1952 as Baza Remontowa - Ostrów with its registered office in Gdańsk.
 7 November 1952 change of name to Gdańska Stocznia Remontowa.
 In the 1960s, the yard built warships and research vessels for the Polish Navy and for export to the USSR, operating under the name Northern Shipyard.

Facilities
Remontowa shipyard has a new-build shipyard and a separate ship repair/conversion yard. The site also has a design officer and some component manufacturing facilities.

Newbuilds

Car ferries Argyle, Bute and Finlaggan for Scottish ferry operator Caledonian MacBrayne
Hybrid car ferries Ben Woollacott and Dame Vera Lynn for Transport for London's Woolwich Ferry
All four members of the Salish-class ferries for BC Ferries
Luxury passenger ferries Simara Ace and Siluna Ace for Ace Link
Four LNG powered car ferries for Norwegian ferry operator Fjord1
Multi functional tenders Galatea & Pharos
Icebreaking Emergency Evacuation Vessel
ORP Kormoran (601) - mine-hunter of the Polish Navy
Six tugboats for the Polish Navy, the sixth, designated H-13 was completed in May 2021.

Conversions
Lodbrog - Conversion into cable layer
Red Osprey, Red Eagle and Red Falcon - Lengthened
Queen of Scandinavia - Fitting of new bow section and sponsons
Stena Baltica - Rebuilt for double deck loading
Finnpartner - Conversion to drive through vehicle ferry
Dana Sirena - Conversion from freight to passenger ferry
Peter Wessel - Addition of side sponsons to meet SOLAS regulations

See also
Gdansk Shipyard

References

Shipyards of Poland
Manufacturing companies established in 1952
1952 establishments in Poland
Companies based in Gdańsk